The Grear Prehistoric Village Site is an archeological site located near Crystal Beach, Cecil County, Maryland.  The site was discovered and tested by an amateur archeologist in 1971.  It is the northernmost known Late Woodland period village site on the Eastern Shore of the Chesapeake Bay outside of the Susquehanna River Basin.

It was listed on the National Register of Historic Places in 1975.

References

External links
, including photo from 1975, at Maryland Historical Trust website

Archaeological sites in Cecil County, Maryland
Archaeological sites on the National Register of Historic Places in Maryland
Native American history of Maryland
Late Woodland period
National Register of Historic Places in Cecil County, Maryland